Peter Morrison (1944–1995) was a British Conservative politician

Peter Morrison may also refer to:

Peter Morrison (Australian footballer) (born 1956), former Footscray and South Melbourne VFL footballer
Peter Morrison (English footballer) (born 1980), former Scunthorpe United association footballer
Peter Morrison (jurist), Australian magistrate
Peter Morrison (All Saints)
Peter Morrison (Labour politician)
Peter Morrison, pipe and whistle player of Peatbog Faeries

See also
Pete Morrison (1880–1973), American silent western film actor